Northeastern Pomo, also known as Salt Pomo, is a Pomoan language of Northern California. There are no living fluent speakers. It was spoken along Stony Creek, a tributary of the Sacramento River. Northeastern was one of seven mutually unintelligible Pomoan languages spoken in Northern California. Unlike the other six Pomoan languages(going to north to south: Northern Pomo, Central Pomo, Eastern Pomo, Southeastern Pomo, Kashaya Pomo, Southern Pomo), Northeastern Pomo was not spoken in an area immediately contiguous with any other Pomoan-speaking area. Northeastern Pomo speakers were ringed by speakers of Yuki, Nomlaki, and Patwin; Yuki is unrelated to Pomoan or Nomlaki and Patwin, both of which are within the Wintu language family.

References

External links
Northeastern Pomo language project at the Western Institute for Endangered Language Documentation
Northeastern Pomo language overview at the Survey of California and Other Indian Languages
OLAC resources in and about the Northeastern Pomo language

Pomoan languages
Indigenous languages of California
Extinct languages of North America
Languages extinct in the 1960s